Gustav Adolf's Page is a 1960 German-Austrian historical adventure film directed by Rolf Hansen and starring Liselotte Pulver, Curd Jürgens, and Ellen Schwiers. It is based on the 1882 novel  by Conrad Ferdinand Meyer.

It was shot at the Rosenhügel Studios in Vienna and on location in the Bavarian town of Rothenburg ob der Tauber.

Cast

References

Bibliography

External links 
 

1960 films
1960s historical drama films
Austrian historical drama films
German historical drama films
West German films
1960s German-language films
Films directed by Rolf Hansen
Films based on Swiss novels
Films set in the 1630s
Films set in the Holy Roman Empire
Cross-dressing in film
Films shot at Rosenhügel Studios
1960 drama films
1960s German films